Krastyu Semerdzhiev (born 21 May 1954) is a Bulgarian former weightlifter who competed in the 1976 Summer Olympics.

References

1954 births
Living people
Bulgarian male weightlifters
Olympic weightlifters of Bulgaria
Weightlifters at the 1976 Summer Olympics
Olympic silver medalists for Bulgaria
Olympic medalists in weightlifting
Medalists at the 1976 Summer Olympics
20th-century Bulgarian people
21st-century Bulgarian people